The Istiqlal Party is a political party in Morocco. It is a conservative and monarchist party and a member of the Centrist Democrat International and International Democrat Union. Istiqlal headed a coalition government under Abbas El Fassi from 19 September 2007 to 29 November 2011. From 2013 to 2021, it was part of the opposition. Since 2021 it is part of a coalition government led by Aziz Akhannouch.

The party emerged in the anti-colonial struggle against French and Spanish imperial rule.

History and profile

The party was founded in April 1937 as the National Party for Istiqlal, and became the Istiqlal Party 10 December 1943. Istiqlal held strongly Arab nationalist views and was the main political force struggling for the independence of Morocco. The party was often critical of the ruling monarchy, after being instrumental in gaining independence from French colonialism. Independence was achieved in 1956, and the party then moved into opposition against the monarchy, which had asserted itself as the country's main political actor.

There was a movement within the Istiqlal Party to unite Muslims and Jews called al-Wifaq, with prominent Jewish figures such as Armand Asoulin, David Azoulay, Marc Sabbagh, Joe O’Hana, and Albert Aflalo.

Together with the leftist National Union of Popular Forces (UNFP), which split from Istiqlal in 1959, and later the Socialist Union of Popular Forces (USFP), the Istiqlal would form the backbone of the opposition to King Hassan II in the years to come. The Istiqlal party has taken part in many coalition governments from the late 1970s until the mid-1980s. In 1998, together with the USFP inside the Koutla and other smaller parties, the Istiqlal formed the Alternance, the first political experience in the Arab World where the opposition assumed power through the ballots.

For the party's leader Allal El Fassi, a proponent of "Greater Morocco", Morocco's independence would not be complete without the liberation of all the territories that once were part of Morocco.

In January 2006, Istiqlal criticized Spanish Prime Minister José Luis Rodríguez Zapatero's visit to the Spanish cities of Ceuta and Melilla on the north African coast, reflecting its nationalist heritage.

Istiqlal won 52 out of 325 seats in the parliamentary election held on 7 September 2007, more than any other party, and subsequently the party's leader, Abbas El Fassi, was named Prime Minister by King Mohammed VI on 19 September 2007.

The party won 60 out of 325 seats in the parliamentary election held in November 2011, being the second party in the parliament.Abbas El Fassi resigned as Prime Minister 29 November 2011, and resigned as Secretary-General of Istiqlal on 23 September 2012, following Justice and Development Party victory in 2011 elections.

In September 2012, Hamid Chabat was elected secretary-general of the party succeeding Abbas El Fassi.

In 2016, Istiqlal won 46 seats in parliamentary elections, a loss of 14 seats. The party joined the opposition.

Istiqlal is a member of the Centrist Democrat International and International Democrat Union, and an associate member of the Alliance of European Conservatives and Reformists.

On October 7, 2017, Nizar Baraka was elected Secretary-General of the Istiqlal party, by 924 votes against 230 votes for his rival and outgoing secretary-general Hamid Chabat.

Electoral performance

House of Representatives

References

External links
Official site
official website in french

1944 establishments in Morocco
Conservative parties in Africa
Monarchist parties
Moroccan nationalism
Arab nationalism
Nationalist parties in Africa
Arab nationalist political parties
Political parties established in 1944
Political parties in Morocco
Social conservative parties